Billy The Fist (born William Edward Dagsher in Lynwood, California) is a Los Angeles-based bass player, songwriter, producer, actor, film editor and director.

Since 2009, Billy has been the bass player with London, an American heavy metal band co-founded by Nikki Sixx of Mötley Crüe in 1978.

He has recorded and/or appeared on stage with Lanny Cordola (Giuffria, House of Lords), Joey Allen (Warrant), Michael Olivieri (Leatherwolf), Michael T. Ross (Lita Ford, Raiding The Rock Vault), Brian MacLeod (Toy Matinee, Leonard Cohen, Tears for Fears), Glen Sobel (Alice Cooper), Gary Griffin (The Beach Boys), actor John Stamos, Joel Taylor (Stanley Clarke, Allan Holdsworth, Frank Gambale, Yanni), Gilby Clarke (Guns N' Roses), Robbie Wyckoff (Roger Waters, Pablo Cruise), Harry Waters (Roger Waters), and Teddy Andreadis (Guns N' Roses, Billy Bob Thornton), among others.

From 1999-2003 Billy was musical director/bandleader on the cooking show Food Rules starring Tom Riehl. The show featured cooking with celebrity guests including Floyd Sneed and Joe Scermie of Three Dog Night.

Billy is a registered BMI songwriter.

Acting, film editing and directing

In film, Billy works under either one of his names: Billy The Fist or William Edward Dagsher. He has appeared in films and television, including The World's End (2010) and Spike TV's Operation Repo (2013). He also directed and edited several short films for Lanny Cordola's Miraculous Love Kids, a non-profit, 501(c)(3) organization.

Billy is a member of SAG-AFTRA as an actor.

Personal life

Billy was raised in Compton, California, and began playing the bass in the eighth grade. He started his first band a year later, and by the time he was 17, he was playing professionally on the Hollywood club circuit.

Presently, Billy resides in Orange County, California. In addition to London, he plays bass with a variety of pickup groups throughout Southern California. He is still active as an actor, film editor and director as well.

Equipment endorsements

 Fender basses
 Ampeg amplifiers

Discography 
 Lanny Cordola - Afghan Lullaby (2015) (bass, production, artwork)
 London - Call That Girl (2018) (bass)

Filmography
 The World's End (2010) (actor)
 Blood Relatives (2012) (actor)
 Stage to Screen: Classics on Camera (2013) (actor) 
 Operation Repo (2013) (actor) 
 Lanny Cordola - Is There A Ghost (2014) (director, editor)
 The Dream of a Ridiculous Man (2015) (director, editor)
 Lanny & The Miraculous Love Kids/Girl with a Guitar (2016) (director, editor)

References

 
 Metal Archives - Billy The Fist 
 Billy The Fist Biography

External links
  Metal Archives - Billy The Fist
  Billy The Fist Biography
 
 

Living people
Year of birth missing (living people)